Círculos (Spanish for "circles") is Madre Matilda's second and last album.  It was produced by  Jorge "Pelo" Madueño and released under the Sony Music - Columbia Label. A video clip was released for the "Círculos" track.

Track listing 

"Círculos" – 3:43
"Sin llorar" – 4:34
"Entre tus brazos" – 3:20
"Manos blancas" – 3:36
"De cabeza" – 3:24
"Regresa" – 5:30
"En soledad" – 3:53
"Tragando el polvo" – 3:38
"Deja de llorar" – 2:56
"Las hadas" – 4:37
"Si fuera" – 4:12
"Reflejada" – 3:02

Personnel
 Pierina Less: Vocals
 Carlos Salas: Guitar
 Vitucho Malasquez: Bass guitar
 Jorge Olazo: Drums
 Producer: Jorge "Pelo" Madueño,
 Guest Musicians: Pelo Madueño (bass tracks 3 and 6), Vitucho Malasquez (bass, tracks 9 and 10), J. Madueño (bajo 4,5 y 8), Claudio Quiñónes (programming).
 Arrangements: Pelo and Madre Matilda.
 Art, photograph, and video director: Mauricio Muñoz.
 Photography: María Lourdes Rodríguez
 Music and lyrics:  Carlos Salas and Pierina Less, except for "Regresa" by Augusto Polo Campos.

Recording
The album was recorded at Estudios Tu Puta Madre, El Techo. It was mixed in Garage Produce (Chile) and mastered in Garage Produce by Claudio Quiñónes.

References

 Peru.com interviews Madre Matilda 

2000 albums
Madre Matilda albums